The 1938–39 season was the 62nd Scottish football season in which Dumbarton competed at national level, entering the Scottish Football League and the Scottish Cup.

Scottish League

Dumbarton went into their 16th successive season in the Second Division encouraged by the positive performance from the previous campaign, and indeed with 6 wins and 3 draws from their first 10 games, it seemed that at last a challenge on the title could be mounted, but as before, the good results couldn't be maintained, and with only one win from the next 12 games the chance was gone.  In the end, Dumbarton finished a disappointing 11th out of 18, with 30 points - half of that gathered by champions Cowdenbeath.

Scottish Cup

Dumbarton fell at the 'first hurdle' in a shock defeat to non-league minnows Blairgowrie.

Player statistics

|}

Source:

Transfers

Players in

Players out 

In addition John Curly, Archibald Duffy, William Kemp, James McKain and Willie White all played their last games in Dumbarton 'colours'.

Source:

References

Dumbarton F.C. seasons
Scottish football clubs 1938–39 season